Ali Shukriu (Serbian: Али Шукрија, Ali Šukrija; 12 September 1919 – 6 January 2005) was a political figure of Kosovo, during its period as an autonomous province of Yugoslavia. He served as the 2nd Chairmen of the Executive Council of SAP Kosovo from 1963 until May 1967, 2nd President of the Presidency of SAP Kosovo from August 1981 to 1982 and lastly as the 7th President of the Presidency of the Central Committee of the League of Communists of Yugoslavia from 26 June 1984 until 25 June 1985.

Early life
Ali Shukriu was born in Kosovska Mitrovica and studied medicine at the University of Belgrade before World War II. He joined the communist movement in 1939, was arrested in 1941, but was then able to join the partisans. After the war, he studied at the
Đuro Đaković high political school of Belgrade and was public prosecutor in Kosovo in 1945.

Political career
Shukriu subsequently became Serbian minister of the interior and in 1950 was a member of the Serbian parliament. In his later political career, Shukriu was vice chairman of the executive council of Kosovo, and from 1963 to May 1967 succeeded Fadil Hoxha as chairman, becoming virtual prime minister of Kosovo. Following the purge of Xhavid Nimani in August 1981, he also served briefly, until 1982, as president of the presidium. Shukriu is remembered as a particularly pro-Yugoslav politician who served Belgrade loyally in the face of a rising Albanian nationalist movement. In 1989 he resigned from Kosovo's political structures during the miners' strike.

Later life
Shukriu lived the rest of his life in retirement in Belgrade until his death in 2005.

Succession

References

Politicians from Mitrovica, Kosovo
League of Communists of Kosovo politicians
University of Belgrade Faculty of Medicine alumni
1919 births
2005 deaths
Central Committee of the League of Communists of Yugoslavia members
Yugoslav Albanians
Recipients of the Order of the Hero of Socialist Labour